Maxwell Park railway station is a railway station in Pollokshields area of Glasgow, Scotland, adjacent to the park of the same name. The station is managed by ScotRail and is located on the Cathcart Circle Line, which has been electrified since 1962 by British Railways.

History 
Maxwell Park station was built in 1894 by the Caledonian Railway, as an extension of the earlier Cathcart District Railway back towards Glasgow Central. The station is now protected as a category B listed building.

Services

Up to November 1979 
Two trains per hour between Glasgow Central and Kirkhill and one train per hour in each direction on the Cathcart Circle (Inner and Outer).

From November 1979 
Following the opening of the Argyle Line on 5 November 1979, two trains per hour between Glasgow Central and Kirkhill and two trains per hour in each direction on the Cathcart Circle (Inner and Outer).

From 2006 
One train per hour between Glasgow Central and Newton and one train per hour in each direction on the Cathcart Circle (Inner and Outer). On Sundays the Circle services do not run, so only 1tph calls each way to/from Newton.

Routes

References

Notes

Sources

See also 

Railway stations in Glasgow
Former Caledonian Railway stations
Railway stations in Great Britain opened in 1894
SPT railway stations
Railway stations served by ScotRail
Category B listed buildings in Glasgow
Listed railway stations in Scotland
Pollokshields